Luis Federico Thompson (19 December 1927 – 8 January 2010) was an Argentine professional boxer. Born in Colon, Panama, he later moved to Argentina where he was nationalized and afterwards became the Argentine and South American boxing champion.

Career

Thompson debuted in 1947 with a fight against Wilfredo Brown in Panama City which ended in a draw. On October 7, 1951, he fought Wilfredo Brewster defeating him and winning the Panamanian Lightweight Title for the first time. Two months later, he fought Wilfredo Brown again. Brown won the match by TKO in the 8th round taking the title from Thompson. A month later on January 27, 1952, Thompson and Brown had their second rematch where Thompson won by decision, reclaiming the Panamanian Lightweight Title in the process.

Thompson traveled to Luna Park in Buenos Aires for his July 12, 1952, fight against local boxer José María Gatica. Thompson lost by knockout in the 8th round. He decided to move to Argentina. In 1959, he defeated Cirilo Gil to become the Argentine champion.

Thompson traveled to New York City for his March 25, 1960 fight against Benny Paret. The fight ended in a draw. They had a rematch on December 10, 1960. Thompson was defeated by unanimous decision.

On October 6, 1962, he defeated Jorge Peralta to win the South American Welterweight title. His last fight was against Raul Roldan on November 14, 1963, where Thompson won by decision.

Thompson died on January 8, 2010, in Buenos Aires, Argentina after a long battle with illness.

Professional boxing record

References

External links
 

Naturalized citizens of Argentina
Panamanian male boxers
Welterweight boxers
1927 births
2010 deaths